Firpo-Dempsey is a 1923 animated short, directed by Quirino Cristiani. It is a parody of the boxing match between Jack Dempsey and Argentinean boxer Luis Ángel Firpo. At the time the picture was very popular with Argentinean audiences. Today the film is considered lost.

See also
 Jack Dempsey vs. Luis Ángel Firpo

References

External links
 

Argentine animated short films
Argentine black-and-white films
Argentine silent short films
Argentine boxing films
1923 films
1923 animated films
1920s sports films
Boxing animation
Animation based on real people
Cultural depictions of Jack Dempsey
Cultural depictions of Argentine men
Cultural depictions of boxers
Films directed by Quirino Cristiani
Lost animated films
Lost Argentine films
1923 lost films
1920s animated short films
Lost sports films
Silent sports films